During the Second World War, Nicolas Redner Bodington OBE (6 June 1904 – 3 July 1974) served in the F section of the Special Operations Executive.  He took part in four missions to France.

Life

Pre-war
Nicolas Bodington was the son of Oliver Bodington international lawyer and Mary (née Redner). He was born in Paris. His elder brother was Lieutenant Colonel John Redner Bodington DSO MC, a soldier who served in World War I and World War II. Nicolas Bodington studied at Cheltenham College and (for a year) at Lincoln College, Oxford before becoming a journalist, working from 1930 onwards for the Daily Express. He married Audrey Hoffmann in Cheltenham in September 1926. Before the war, he was Reuters's press correspondent in Paris. There he mixed with Karl Bömelburg, who was later head of the Gestapo in France, and Henri Déricourt, who was later a triple agent.  He also worked for MI6 for a time.

In 1938 his novel Solo was published in England by Gollancz.

His name is misspelt frequently. Records of his birth, military service, marriage and death all show that his first name was Nicolas. This agrees with his name as given on the covers of both of his published books.

Wartime service
In 1940 he joined the F section as its General Staff Officer II, assisting Leslie Humphreys, then, from December, H.R. Marriott.  At the start of 1941, he recruited Virginia Hall and at the start of summer that year, Maurice Buckmaster became Section F's head.
  
His various cover identities and code names were "NICK", "ANDRE EDOUARD", "JEAN PAUL", "PIERROT" and "PEDLAR".

At the start of 1942 Bodington participated in the landing by boat in Brittany which picked up Pierre de Vomécourt, codename Lucas, head of the AUTOGIRO network, and Mathilde Carré, codename Victoire, the famous spy nicknamed La Chatte.

1942 mission
On the night of 29/30 July 1942, he was sent to France to evaluate the value to F Section of collaborating with André Girard's CARTE network.  Landing from the sailing ship Seadog at Golfe-Juan, shortly afterwards he made contact with Girard and Henri Frager at Cannes.  He wished to meet with the head of the Armée d'armistice. André Girard put him in contact with colonel Vautrin, formerly head of Paul Reynaud's cabinet, and asked for large quantities of arms, which Bodington promised to supply.  He met with Peter Churchill, and also went to Lyon to try to undo the chaos that was then reigning there.  On the night of 31 August, Bodington re-embarked on Seadog and sailed for Gibraltar, arriving on 9 September.  When he returned to England, his enthusiastic report on CARTE (delivered on 12 September) formed the foundation for the use of CARTE's file as the basis for recruitment for the Prosper – PHYSICIAN network by its heads Francis Suttill (Prosper) and Andrée Borrel (Denise) on their arrival in France.

Major General Colin Gubbins head of SOE wrote of his successful mission, "As a result of his ingenuity, resourcefulness and perseverance, it has been possible to establish close relations with a very important group of French patriots. This contact would not have been successfully made without the personal visit of this officer".  He was recommended for the award of the MBE.

1943 mission to France
In 1943 Bodington supported the candidacy of Henri Déricourt a former civil airline pilot, who was engaged by F section and sent to France in February that year, codenamed Gilbert, to organise aerial rendezvous for F Section.  

Special Operations Executive agent Francis Suttill had been chosen to establish a new network in and around Paris, called "Prosper" (also called "Physician"). In September 1942, Andrée Borrel was parachuted into France to prepare the way for Suttill who arrived on 1 October 1942. A wireless operator, Gilbert Norman arrived in November 1942 and a second operator, Jack Agazarian, arrived the following month. Transport for the Prosper network was mainly provided by Henri Déricourt. Suttill and Jack Agazarian became increasingly concerned about the loyalty of Déricourt. In May 1943, Francis Suttill returned to London and he passed on his fears to Nicolas Bodington and Maurice Buckmaster. However, they were unconvinced and refused to recall Déricourt to Britain.

Preparing to return to France Bodington discussed the situation with Maurice Buckmaster and left a note on record at SOE Headquarters dated 23 June 1943 concerning Dericourt, "we know he is in contact with the Germans and also how and why" (suggesting that he may have been feeding the Germans with false intelligence provided by London.

He was decorated as a Member of the Order of the British Empire Military Division (MBE) as Captain, Temporary Major, British Army, General List in the London Gazette dated 20 July 1943. 
Bodington arrived in France aboard a special duties Lockheed Hudson aircraft of No. 161 Squadron RAF flown by Lewis Hodges DSO DFC AFC, which landed near Angers on the night of 22–23 July 1943.

He was to clarify the circumstances surrounding the collapse of the Prosper network in June and the role of Henri Déricourt (Gilbert), who was strongly suspected of having betrayed several agents.  Jack Agazarian (Marcel, arrested later in this mission) and the Belgian Adelin Marissael accompanied him back to France. Oddly, it was Déricourt who welcomed them when they landed, in the field Achille 1 km to the southeast of Soucelles.  Bodington and Agazarian travelled to Paris with Dericourt where they tried to establish if Gilbert Norman was active. Tossing a coin to choose who would visit Norman's address Agazarian lost and when he visited was arrested by the Gestapo. Having escaped the Germans, Bodington exonerated Déricourt (though he was dismissed from SOE) and tried to convince Noor Inayat Khan to return to England (she refused) [There is NO evidence for this]
, Bodington returned on the night of 16–17 August 1943 by Lysander flown by Hugh Verity DSO DFC, along with Lise and Claude de Baissac. He did not believe that Déricourt was betraying British agents as he had been active in Paris for some time himself and had not been arrested.

For the following six months he lectured and wrote reports on the intricacies of the French political situation for the forces preparing for D-Day.

1944 mission

On 11 February 1944 in London, he interrogated Henri Dericourt who had returned from France, to ascertain his loyalties.

In the spring of 1944 Bodington was due to return to France on an SOE mission to the southwest of France as the organiser of a resistance network but the mission was cancelled at the last moment, possibly due to concerns over an informant in France, later identified as BOUSQUET, following the arrest of Charles Skepper, Eliane Plewman and Arthur Steele (SOE agent).

SFHQ sent him back to France under the codename Jean. Knowing that the Gestapo had a photograph of him and a price on his head Bodington parachuted on the night of 10 July 1944 into the dangerous Chalons-sur-Marne district to reactivate the PROFESSOR network in its new identity as the PEDLAR network, and to assist the French Resistance.  Accompanied by a small Special Air Service team of four men he provided useful information for RAF bombing objectives and, from 24 August, was attached to Operation Jedburgh with the "Arnold" team. It was a mission in which SOE and similar units operated in France with the SAS behind German lines carrying out acts of sabotage. In total, 93 Jedburgh teams operated in 54 French metropolitan départements between June and December 1944. They were known by codenames which usually were first names (such as "Hugh"), with some names of medicines (such as "Novocaine") and a few random names thrown in to confuse German intelligence.

Bodington was recommended for a gallantry award, the Military Cross for his service in France, the recommendation recorded his previous missions to France and his return despite knowing that the Gestapo had his photograph and adds that – In the short time at his disposal Bodington arranged several receptions of arms and stores (parachuted by the Royal Air Force) to the French resistance in the Marne Department and organised guerrilla warfare against enemy garrisons and convoys passing through the area. In the St. Dizier, and Chaumont regions he took part in several clashes with the enemy and showed great courage in dealing with German formations by the use of the BAZOOKA and the PIAT. After his positions had been over-run by the American advance he passed through enemy lines several times to obtain valuable intelligence.     He was recommended for a Military Cross for gallantry in action in Normandy but eventually received an OBE instead.

1945

Bodington worked for both Special Operations Executive and also the "Secret Intelligence Service" MI6, possibly simultaneously, and as the result of internal rivalries appears to have been the victim of an internal smear campaign suggesting that he may have had wartime contact with the German Sicherheitsdienst which was not always in the best interest of his country.  The National Archives in London hold a file KV2/830 documenting an investigation carried out into these claims from February to July 1945 which it classifies as :

Twice decorated for bravery Captain Bodington resigned his commission on 7 July 1945 and was granted permission to retain the rank of Major.

After the war
In June 1948 he was a witness at the trial of Henri Déricourt, a French agent of SOE who was known to have had contact with the German Sicherheitsdienst and Gestapo and is often regarded as having been a double or triple agent.  Bodington's testimony was decisive in bringing about Dericourt's acquittal and suggests that Dericourt may have fed false intelligence to the Germans.

In 1961 his second book was published by Andre Deutsch, The Awakening Sahara.

Awards 
UK : Member of the Order of the British Empire Military Division (MBE). Awarded as Captain, Temporary Major, British Army, General List in the London Gazette dated 20 July 1943. 
UK : Officer of the Order of the British Empire Military Division (OBE). Awarded as a Major, British Army, General List in the London Gazette dated 21 January 1947.
France : Médaille de la Résistance

Recommended for the Military Cross for service with SAS Operation Jedburgh teams in Northern France in July 1944.

References

Sources and external links 
 
 Michael Richard Daniell Foot, SOE in France. An account of the Work of the British Special Operations Executive in France, 1940–1944, London, Her Majesty's Stationery Office, 1966, 1968 ; Whitehall History Publishing, in association with Frank Cass, 2004. Official History of SOE in Europe..
 André Gillois, L'Histoire secrète des Français à Londres, Le Cercle du nouveau Livre, Librairie Jules Taillandier, 1973.

 
 
 
 

1904 births
1974 deaths
Military personnel from Paris
British Army personnel of World War II
British Special Operations Executive personnel
Officers of the Order of the British Empire
People educated at Cheltenham College
Alumni of Lincoln College, Oxford
Daily Express people
Recipients of the Resistance Medal